The 1966–67 Coupe de France was its 50th edition. It was won by Olympique Lyonnais which defeated FC Sochaux-Montbéliard in the Final.

Round of 16

Quarter-finals

Semi-finals
First round

Second round

Third round

Olympique Lyonnais qualified after winning a toss.

Final

References

French federation

1966–67 domestic association football cups
1966–67 in French football
1966-67